Pholami people reside in the Phek district of Nagaland, India.

People from Phek district